Of Love and Evil is a fantasy novel by American author Anne Rice, part of her Songs of the Seraphim series, which tells the story of Toby O'Dare, an assassin with a tragic past. The book received a 2011 Christianity Today Book Award.

Plot summary
Toby O'Dare, former government assassin, is summoned by the angel Malchiah to 15th century Rome to solve a terrible crime of poisoning and to uncover the secrets of an earthbound restless spirit, a diabolical dybbuk. Toby is plunged into this rich age as a lutist sent to charm and calm this troublesome spirit.

In the fullness of the high Italian Renaissance, Toby soon discovers himself in the midst of dark plots and counterplots, surrounded by a still darker and more dangerous threat as the veil of ecclesiastical terror closes in around him. And as he once again embarks on a powerful journey of atonement, he is reconnected with his own past, with matters light and dark, fierce and tender, with the promise of salvation and with a deeper and richer vision of love.

References

External links
Anne Rice's Official site
Of Love and Evil on Amazon

2010 American novels
Novels by Anne Rice
Alfred A. Knopf books
Novels set in Rome
Novels set in the 15th century